Brazil–Venezuela relations refers to the diplomatic relations between the bordering countries of Brazil and Venezuela.

History

2000-2010 
In 2001, Venezuela and Brazil opened a high-voltage power line between the two countries to supply electricity from Venezuela to energy-starved northern Brazil. The line provides cheap hydro-electric power to Brazil and also earns Venezuela tens of millions of dollars every year.

In 2007, Brazil and Venezuela pledged closer trade and energy ties, including building a new oil refinery in Brazil. The $4.5bn refinery scheme to be completed in 2010 will be 40%-owned by Venezuela's state oil firm PDVSA, while Brazil's national oil firm Petrobras will hold the rest.

Venezuela purchased 1,500 tonnes of coffee beans from Brazil on 10 August 2009 after falling out with Colombia over its decision to allow an increased United States presence in its military bases.

2010-2020 
On 18 June 2015, a mission of Brazilian senators led by Sen. Aécio Neves (mostly composed by opposition legislatives to Pres. Dilma Rousseff) flew to Caracas with interest to visit Venezuelan prisoner Leopoldo López and families of victims of the protests against President Nicolás Maduro. About a kilometer away from the Simón Bolívar International Airport, the vehicle carrying the senators was prevented to continue the trip after being stopped and surrounded by government protesters. Finally, the Brazilian senators decided to return to Brazil on the same day. The legislative houses Câmara dos Deputados and Senado Federal of Brazil issued motions of rejection to such events. The Ministry of Foreign Affairs of Brazil issued an Official Note expressing his annoyance with the "unacceptable hostile acts" that occurred that day and asking for official explanations from the Government of Venezuela.

During the Brazilian government of President Jair Bolsonaro since 2019, Brazil has cut off the relations with the current Venezuelan government of president Nicolás Maduro. Brazil downgraded its diplomatic relations with the ruling Venezuelan government. In the Venezuelan presidential crisis, Brazil has recognised Venezuelan opposition leader Juan Guaidó as the legitimate President of Venezuela. In April 2020, Brazil closed its embassy in Venezuela.

2020-present 
Brazil-Venezuela relations featured as a significant issue in the 2022 election. Far-right incumbent Jair Bolsonaro, his surrogates and supporters repeatedly sought to undermine the campaign of leftist challenger ex-President Luiz Inácio Lula da Silva by making a series of claims that Lula had a desire to ‘turn Brazil into Venezuela’, that under Lula’s previous administrations, he had financed Venezuelan infrastructure development through the Brazilian National Development Bank (BNDES) at the expense of Brazilian infrastructure development, and that Lula was ‘in love’ with 'Maduro and other dictators.' Meanwhile, Bolsonaro was accused of paedophilia and perversion by his opponents for a podcast in which he recalled a meeting he had with ‘pretty girls, 14 and 15 years old … all Venezuelans’ in São Sebastião, stating that he ‘felt a spark.’ Bolsonaro later apologised for his remarks.

Following Bolsonaro’s defeat in Brazil’s presidential runoff, Venezuelan President Nicolás Maduro congratulated Lula and reported the resumption of a ‘Binational Cooperation Agenda between our countries’ following a telephone conversation with the President-elect. On December 14th, Brazil’s incoming Minister of Foreign Relations Mauro Vieira stated that Lula had instructed him to re-establish relations with Venezuela. Vieira noted that from day one of the new administration, January 1st 2023, a chargé d’affaires would be sent to Venezuela to retake diplomatic buildings owned by Brazil, and to re-open the Brazilian embassy in Caracas. When questioned over the status of Juan Guaidó, Vieira said that Brazil would ‘recognise the government that was elected, and that is there; it is the government of President Maduro,’ while Lula, during the presidential campaign labelled Guaidó as an ‘impostor.’ In recognition of such comments, Guaido’s ambassador to Brazil, Maria Teresa Belandria, has initiated plans to exit Brazil before Lula’s inauguration. Meanwhile, Vieira confirmed previous reports that contact has been made with the government to reverse its travel ban on Venezuelan officials to allow Maduro to attend Lula’s inauguration.

References 

 
Venezuela
Brazil